The 2016 Guzzini Challenger was a professional tennis tournament played on hard courts. It was the fourteenth edition of the tournament which was part of the 2016 ATP Challenger Tour. It took place in Recanati, Italy between 18 and 24 July 2016.

Singles main-draw entrants

Seeds

 1 Rankings are as of July 11, 2016.

Other entrants
The following players received wildcards into the singles main draw:
  Riccardo Bonadio
  Andrea Vavassori
  Andrey Rublev
  Antonio Massara

The following players entered  the singles main draw with a protected ranking:
  Albano Olivetti

The following player entered the singles main draw as a special exempt:
  Gianluca Mager

The following players received entry from the qualifying draw:
  Viktor Galović
  Alexander Bublik
  Mate Delić
  Filip Veger

The following player entered as a lucky losers:
  Dzmitry Zhyrmont
  Rémi Boutillier

Doubles main-draw entrants

Seeds

 1 Rankings are as of July 11, 2016.

Other entrants
The following pairs received entry as wildcards:
  Edoardo Lamberti /  Panide Mangiaterra
  Sam Barnett /  Jesse Witten

Champions

Singles

  Illya Marchenko def.  Ilya Ivashka, 6–4, 6–4

Doubles

  Kevin Krawietz /  Albano Olivetti def.  Ruben Bemelmans /  Adrián Menéndez Maceiras, 6–3, 7–6(7–4)

External links
Official Website

Guzzini Challenger
Guzzini Challenger
2016 in Italian tennis